Kelvin Smart (born 12 December 1960) is a Welsh former professional boxer who competed from 1979 to 1987. He held the British flyweight title from 1982 to 1984.

Boxing career
Smart began his boxing career as a promising amateur, fighting out of the Wingfield Amateur Boxing Club based in his home town of Caerphilly. In 1979 he entered the ABA Championships held at Wembley Arena in London. He reached the final where he lost to Ray Gilbody, who would later become the British bantamweight champion.

Smart turned professional in 1979, facing his first opponent, George Bailey, on 10 September in Birmingham. He stopped Bailey via technical knockout in the fourth round. Smart was prolific during 1979, following his opening victory with four further limited round bouts; winning each of the contests. Despite only having five fights under his belt, at the end of 1979 Smart was listed as second only to "Champagne" Charlie Magri in the British flyweight rankings.  Smart continued his successful start to his career by beating Ian Murray in early 1980. He followed this with two wins over Iggy Jano and a win over Mohammed Younis, though when Smart and Younis were rematched a month later the referee declared the eight round match a draw. Smart took six months out before returning to the ring in November 1980 to beat Central region bantamweight champion, Steve Enwright.

Smart began 1981 with a trip to Solihull, where he took a unanimous decision over Neil McLaughlin. Three months later, on 20 June, he needed just three rounds to dispatch Eddie Glencross at an encounter at the Empire Pool in Wembley. His third and final match of the year was against Liverpudlian Jimmy Bott on the undercard of Alan Minter's swansong fight at Wembley. Of the seven bouts arranged on that night, Smart's was the shortest, with Bott knocked out in the first round. Smart's unbeaten record of 14 fights led to him being offered a shot at an eliminator for European Flyweight championship against Spain's Enrique Rodríguez. The fight was arranged for 3 March 1981 and was held on the Spaniard's home soil at Oviedo. The fight went the full twelve rounds, and Rodríguez was given the decision.

Despite suffering the first defeat of his career, Smart's was still one of the United Kingdom's top rated flyweight fighters. In the August of the previous year Charlie Magri had vacated his British flyweight title and Smart was lined up to challenge for the title against fellow Welsh fighter Dave George. The match was held on 14 September 1982 at the Empire pool in Wembley, and Smart and George were given top billing in an event that had both Colin Jones and Frank Bruno fighting on the undercard. The fight was scheduled for 15 rounds, but only lasted until the sixth when George was laid out for the count, making Smart the new British flyweight champion.

He fought just twice in 1984, both non-title competitions, against Tito Abella of the Philippines and Canadian Ian Clyde, both results going to Smart. In January 1985, Smart's first title defense of his British title was arranged. His opponent was Hugh Russell of Northern Ireland, and the bout was arranged at King's Hall in Belfast. The 12 round bout changed hands several times in the early stages until a badly swollen eye forced Smart to retire while in his corner between the sixth and seventh round. Smart took tem months out after losing his British belt, and when he returned it was to suffer an unexpected second round defeat to Ivor Jones.

Smart didn't fight throughout 1985 and on his return in January 1986, he took a narrow points decision over Midlands area bantamweight champion Rocky Lawlor. This was the final win of Smart's career. In February a return trip to Belfast saw him disqualified for a low blow against Dave McAuley, while two months later he was only able to draw against an inexperienced Joe Kelly in Glasgow. He followed this with three overseas bouts against difficult opponents; Alain Limarola and Thierry Jacob of France and Guyanese bantamweight champion Michael Parris. He completed 1986 with a challenge for the vacant Welsh featherweight title, but was outclassed by Peter Harris of Swansea. The next year Smart fought twice, losing to Fabrice Benichou in the first round and then a career ending defeat by future British featherweight champion Sean Murphy.

See also
 List of British flyweight boxing champions

References

External links
 Fight record
 

Welsh male boxers
Flyweight boxers
Featherweight boxers
1960 births
Living people
Sportspeople from Caerphilly